Raymond A. Wertis (January 1, 1922 – January 19, 2006) was a professional basketball player. He played for the Cleveland Rebels, Toronto Huskies, and Providence Steamrollers of the Basketball Association of America (now known as the National Basketball Association).

College career
Ray played college basketball at St. John's University.

Professional career
In the 1946–47 BAA season, Ray played for the Cleveland Rebels and Toronto Huskies. On November 1, 1946, Ray played in the first game in BAA league history in Toronto against the New York Knicks and then on December 16, 1947, Ray was traded by the Huskies with Ed Sadowski to the Cleveland Rebels for Leo Mogus, Dick Schulz, and cash.

In the 1947–48 BAA season, Ray played for the Providence Steamrollers.

In the 1948–1949 season, Ray played with the Saratoga Indians of the New York State Professional League.

BAA career statistics

Regular season

Playoffs

References

External links
 Career Stats

1922 births
2006 deaths
American expatriate basketball people in Canada
American men's basketball players
Cleveland Rebels players
Guards (basketball)
Toronto Huskies players
Providence Steamrollers players
St. John's Red Storm men's basketball players